Rainy Day Woman is a Canadian drama film, directed by Ron Hallis and released in 1970. The film stars Ashley Murray and Helen Keenan as an unhappily married couple whose relationship is tested when the husband begins having an affair with a younger woman.

The cast also includes Linda Henry, Beverly Light, Julie Wildman and Sven Jurshevski.

According to producer John Roston, the film "strikes a peculiar balance between seriousness and comedy. It's not heavy romance but it's not really light fare either. There's a lot of sex in it, but it's not a sexploitation film. Most films made in Canada are either sex films or 'art' films. This one is a marriage of the two."

The film was entered in competition at the 22nd Canadian Film Awards in 1970.

References

External links

1970 films
Canadian drama films
1970 drama films
Films shot in Montreal
English-language Canadian films
1970s Canadian films